Szapsel Rotholc (July 2, 1913, Warsaw, Poland  – 29 February 1996, Montreal, Quebec, Canada) was a Polish boxer.

Born into a Jewish family in Warsaw, he was a member of the Gwiazda Warszawa Boxing Club in 1929–1939. He won the bronze medal in the Flyweight class at the 1934 European Amateur Boxing Championships in Budapest. In 1933 he won the Polish champion title. He represented Poland in many matches: POL vs. HUN (1934, 1935), POL vs. USA (1934), POL vs. CZE (1934), POL vs. GER (1934, 1935, 1938), POL vs. NOR (1937), POL vs. DEN (1937), POL vs. ITA (1938), POL vs. FRA (1938), POL vs. SUI (1938), POL vs. EST (1938), POL vs. SWE (1939), POL vs. FIN (1939), scoring +15 –0 =1. He played also for Warsaw in duals against Dublin (1937), Vienna (1939) and Italy (1939), scoring +2 –1 =0. Rotholc won all fights except two, one drew and one loss with an Italian boxer Guido Nardecchia.

Rotholc took 10th and 6th places, respectively in 1934 and 1935, in the Polish Sportspersonality of the Year, chosen by the readers of the newspaper Przegląd Sportowy.

During the Nazi occupation in World War II, he lived and survived in the Warsaw Ghetto as a Jewish policeman. After the war he lived in Łódź until 1949, when he departed for Canada.

References

1913 births
1982 deaths
Flyweight boxers
Jewish boxers
Warsaw Ghetto inmates
Jewish Ghetto Police
Jewish Canadian sportspeople
Boxers from Warsaw
Canadian people of Polish-Jewish descent
Polish emigrants to Canada
Polish male boxers